Georgios Tourkochoritis (born 12 January 2002) is a Greek professional footballer who plays as a right-back for Super League 2 club Panathinaikos B.

References

2002 births
Living people
Greek footballers
Super League Greece 2 players
Panathinaikos F.C. players
Association football defenders
Footballers from Livadeia
Panathinaikos F.C. B players